The 2016 Granatkin Memorial is its 16th edition after dissolution of the USSR. Russia under-18 is its defending champion.

Groups
All times are Further-eastern European Time (UTC+03:00).

Group A

Group B

Group C

Places 13-14

Places 11-12

Places 9-10

Semifinals

Places 7-8

Places 5-6

Places 3-4

Final

External links
 
 Мемориал Гранаткина. 

Valentin Granatkin Memorial
2016 in association football
2015–16 in Russian football